The fifth season of the Arabic reality talent show The Voice premiered on September 21, 2019, on MBC1 and MBC Masr. Mohamed Hamaki and Ahlam returned as coaches. Ragheb Alama and Samira Said replaced long time coach Assi El Helani and Elissa as coaches.

Teams
Color key

Blind auditions
A new feature within the Blind Auditions this season is the Block, which each coach can use once to prevent one of the other coaches from getting a contestant.

Color key

Episode 1 (Feb. 26)

References

Arab world